John Thomas Smith (28 May 1816 – 30 January 1879) was an Australian politician and seven times Mayor of Melbourne.

Early life
Smith was born at Sydney, the son of John Smith, a Scottish shoemaker, and his wife Elizabeth, née Biggs. He was educated under William Timothy Cape. Smith was apprenticed at 14 years of age to Beaver & Co., builders and joiners, but this was cancelled in 1833. Smith served as a clerk of the recently established Bank of Australasia, but in September 1837 obtained the appointment of schoolmaster at an aboriginal mission station in the colony of Victoria at a salary of £40 a year. Shortly afterwards he went into business as a grocer, and was in the timber trade in 1840. Smith took over the Adelphi Hotel, Flinders Lane, in July 1841 from his brother-in-law Robert Brettagh, and in 1844 replaced Brettagh as licensee of St John's Tavern, Queen Street, adjacent the Queen's Theatre, built for him by Charles Laing.

Politics
At the first election for the Melbourne city council, held on 1 December 1842, Smith was elected a Councillor for the Bourke Ward, and except for a short interval, he was on the Council for the remainder of his life. In 1851 he was elected Mayor of Melbourne and was subsequently re-elected to that position seven times, his last year of office being 1864.

In November 1854, at the time of the Eureka stockade rebellion, Smith took an active part in raising special constables, as there were rumours that attacks on the treasury and banks were contemplated. He was especially thanked by the governor, Sir Charles Hotham, who said there was "no person in the country to whom he was more indebted". Smith had been elected to the Victorian Legislative Council in 1851 for North Bourke and in 1853 for the City of Melbourne. In 1856, when responsible government came in, he was elected a member of the Victorian Legislative Assembly as one of the representatives of Melbourne. At subsequent elections he was returned for Creswick, and West Bourke, retaining his seat until his death on 30 January 1879, when he was the "Father of the House". His wife and children survived him.

Smith took great interest in various charities, for example, moving the motion (subsequently carried) in 1848 for the establishment of a Benevolent Asylum. Smith advocated reductions in the hours of labour and generally was an active and useful member of Council and Parliament, though he only once attained cabinet rank; he was Minister of Mines in the John Alexander MacPherson Government from September 1869 to April 1870.

References

1816 births
1879 deaths
Mayors and Lord Mayors of Melbourne
Members of the Victorian Legislative Council
19th-century Australian politicians